The European Summer School in Information Retrieval (ESSIR) is a scientific event founded in 1990, which starts off a series of Summer Schools to provide high-quality teaching of information retrieval on advanced topics. ESSIR is typically a week-long event consisting of guest lectures and seminars from invited lecturers who are recognized experts in the field.
The aim of ESSIR is to give to its participants a common ground in different aspects of Information Retrieval (IR). Maristella Agosti in 2008 stated that: "The term IR identifies the activities that a person – the user – has to conduct to choose, from a collection of documents, those that can be of interest to him to satisfy a specific and contingent information need."

IR is a discipline with many facets and at the same time influences and is influenced by many other scientific disciplines. Indeed, IR ranges from computer science to information science and beyond; moreover, a large number of IR methods and techniques are adopted and absorbed by several technologies. The IR core methods and techniques are those for designing and developing IR systems, Web search engines, and tools for information storing and querying in Digital Libraries. IR core subjects are: system architectures, algorithms, formal theoretical models, and evaluation of the diverse systems and services that implement functionalities of storing and retrieving documents from multimedia document collections, and over wide area networks such as the Internet.

ESSIR aims to give a deep and authoritative insight of the core IR methods and subjects along these three dimensions and also for this reason it is intended for researchers starting out in IR, for industrialists who wish to know more about this increasingly important topic and for people working on topics related to management of information on the Internet.

Two books have been prepared as readings in IR from editions of ESSIR, the first one is Lectures on Information Retrieval, the second one is Advanced Topics in Information Retrieval.

ESSIR Editions 
ESSIR series started in 1990 coming out from the successful experience of the Summer School in Information Retrieval (SSIR) conceived and designed by Maristella Agosti, University of Padua, Italy and Nick Belkin, Rutgers University, U.S.A., for an Italian audience in 1989.

Notes

External links
 ESSIR presentation page of the IMS Research Group
 IMS Research Group, Department of Information Engineering – University of Padua, Italy
 Department of Information Engineering – University of Padua, Italy
 University of Padua, Italy

Computer science conferences
Information retrieval organizations
Information technology organizations based in Europe
Summer schools